Ndabaningi Sithole (21 July 1920 – 12 December 2000) founded the Zimbabwe African National Union (ZANU), a militant organisation that opposed the government of Rhodesia, in July 1963. Sithole was a progeny of a Ndau father and a Ndebele mother. He also worked as a United Church of Christ in Zimbabwe (UCCZ) minister. He spent 10 years in prison after the government banned ZANU. A rift along tribal lines split ZANU in 1975, and he lost the 1980 elections to Robert Mugabe.

Early life
Sithole was born in Nyamandhlovu, Southern Rhodesia, on 21 July 1920. He studied teaching in the United States from 1955 to 1958, and was ordained a Methodist minister in 1958. The publication of his book African Nationalism and its immediate prohibition by the minority government motivated his entry into politics. During his studies in the United States he studied at the Andover Newton Theological School and attended the First Church in Newton, founded in 1665, both located in Newton, Massachusetts.

ZANU
He was one of the founders and chief architect of Zimbabwe African National Union party in August 1963 in conjunction with Herbert Chitepo, Robert Mugabe and Edgar Tekere in the Highfields House of Enos Nkala. After a split from ZAPU. In 1964 there was a party Congress at Gwelo, where Sithole was elected president and appointed Robert Mugabe to be his secretary general. ZANU was banned in 1964 by Ian Smith's government. He spent 10 years in prison after being arrested on 22 June 1964 alongside Mugabe, Tekere, Nyagumbo and Takawira for his political activities. While in prison he specifically authorised Chitepo to continue the struggle from abroad as a representative of ZANU. Sithole was convicted on a charge of plotting to assassinate Ian Smith and released from prison in 1974.

On 18 March 1975 Chitepo was assassinated in Lusaka, Zambia, with a car bomb. Mugabe, in Mozambique at the time, was unanimously chosen to be the first secretary of ZANU. Later that year there was a factional split, with many Ndebele following Joshua Nkomo into the equally militant ZAPU. Sithole eventually founded the moderate ZANU-Ndonga party, which renounced violent struggle, while the Shona-dominated ZANU (now called ZANU PF) followed Mugabe with a more militant agenda.

Sithole joined Abel Muzorewa's transitional government under the Internal Settlement on 31 July 1979. Later in September 1979 he attended the Lancaster House Agreement, chaired by Lord Carrington, which paved the way for fresh elections, but his ZANU-Ndonga Party's supporters and their villages were targeted by Mugabe's ZANLA troops and it failed to win any seats in the 1980 elections.

His exit from ZANU was claimed by Mugabe to have been caused by his neglecting the fighters in Zambia (where their camp was bombed resulting in many fatalities and casualties).

Exile and return
Declaring that his life was in danger from political enemies, Sithole went into self-imposed exile first in the United Kingdom in the early-1980s and then in Silver Spring, Maryland, United States, around 1984, returning to Zimbabwe in January 1992.

He was elected to parliament for his tribal stronghold of Chipinge in southeastern Zimbabwe in 1995, and was a candidate in the 1996 presidential election (though he withdrew shortly before the election after claiming that Mugabe's ZANU-PF was undermining his campaign). In December 1997, a court tried and convicted him of conspiring with Chimwenje to assassinate Mugabe and the government disqualified him from attending parliament. Sithole's small opposition group again won the Chipinge seat in the June 2000 elections.

He was granted the right to appeal, appeal was filed, but the case was never heard by the Supreme Court. He was allowed bail because of his deteriorating health. He died on 12 December 2000, in Philadelphia, Pennsylvania, United States. The author of three books on African politics, he is survived by his wife, Vesta, and five adult children.

It was later confiscated by Robert Mugabe's ZANU-PF government, on the grounds that it harboured the "undesirables" of Harare. These were people who had been left homeless after being summarily evicted from shanties in Harare before the Commonwealth Heads of Government Meeting 1991. Sithole had felt compassion for them, and what he felt was the breach of their human rights; he therefore had invited some of them to stay on the farm. This incensed the government, which then carried out an eviction operation. This was co-ordinated by the Ministry of Local Government and National Housing as well as the City of Harare. Pre-dawn raids were carried out and, in the aftermath, Porta Farm was confiscated.

Books
Sithole was the most prolific Black author in Rhodesia. He published 12 books including The Polygamist, a novel published in 1972 by The Third Press/Joseph Okpaku Publishing Co., Inc., New York.

References

External links 

 Interview with Ndabaningi Sithole by Tor Sellström within the project Nordic Documentation on the Liberation Struggle in Southern Africa – dated 25 July 1995.

1920 births
2000 deaths
People from Matabeleland North Province
Alumni of Achimota School
Zimbabwe African National Liberation Army personnel
Zimbabwean revolutionaries
People convicted of treason
Prisoners and detainees of Rhodesia
Prisoners and detainees of Zimbabwe
Zimbabwean Methodist ministers
20th-century Methodist ministers
21st-century Methodist ministers
Andover Newton Theological School alumni
Zimbabwe African National Union – Ndonga politicians
Zimbabwean expatriates in the United States
Members of the National Assembly of Zimbabwe
Rhodesian Methodist clergy